Revenge: The Rematches was a boxing card that took place on May 7, 1994, when a quartet of rematch bouts took place at the MGM Grand in Paradise, Nevada.  
The Don King promoted event was one of the largest boxing pay-per-view events ever staged.  It has been called the best pay-per-view card ever and began the tradition of holding major boxing events featuring Mexican or Mexican-American fighters on the Cinco de Mayo weekend. The event was also named Ring Magazine event of the year for 1994.

The rematch bouts included:

Julio César Chávez vs. Frankie Randall for the WBC super lightweight title (Chavez won by technical decision in 8)
Azumah Nelson vs. Jesse James Leija for the WBC super featherweight title (Leija won by unanimous decision in 12)
Gerald McClellan vs. Julian Jackson for the WBC middleweight title (McClellan won by knockout in 1)
Terry Norris vs. Simon Brown for the WBC super welterweight title (Norris won by unanimous decision in 12)

The card also included a WBC strawweight title bout between Kermin Guardia and Ricardo Lopez, which Lopez won by 12 round unanimous decision.

References

 
 

Boxing matches
1994 in boxing
Boxing in Las Vegas
1994 in sports in Nevada
May 1994 sports events in the United States
MGM Grand Garden Arena